The coconut lorikeet (Trichoglossus haematodus), also known as the green-naped lorikeet, is a parrot in the family Psittaculidae. Seven species of lorikeets now recognised were once lumped together under Trichoglossus haematodus.

Taxonomy
In 1758, English naturalist George Edwards described this species as the red-breasted parrakeet in his work Gleanings of Natural History. He had obtained a stuffed specimen from a China warehouse in London, that had come from the East Indies. "It is a parrakeet, equal to any I have seen for beauty; and I believe hath never been described or figured until now." In 1760 the French zoologist Mathurin Jacques Brisson included a description of the coconut lorikeet in his Ornithologie based on a specimen collected on the island of Ambon in Indonesia. He used the French name La perruche variée d'Amboine and the Latin name Psittaca amboinensis varia. Although Brisson coined Latin names, these do not conform to the binomial system and are not recognised by the International Commission on Zoological Nomenclature.

Acknowledging both previous authors as having written about the same species, Carl Linnaeus formally described the coconut lorikeet in 1771 as Psittacus haematod.(us). He had abbreviated the name to avoid it spilling over onto the next line. The shortened form was followed for many years. The specific epithet is from the Ancient Greek haimatōdēs for "blood-red". Hence the translation of its binomial name is "bloody hair-tongue".

For many years, the species was broadly defined with 20 or 22 subspecies recognised, and was known as the rainbow lorikeet. This name has been reapplied to eastern Australian populations, now classified as a distinct species Trichoglossus moluccanus. Also recognised as distinct species are the sunset lorikeet (T. forsteni),  leaf lorikeet (T. weberi), marigold lorikeet (T. capistratus), red-collared lorikeet (T. rubritorquis), and Biak lorikeet (T. rosenbergii).

Six subspecies are recognised:

T. h. haematodus – the nominate subspecies, is found in the southern Moluccas, west Papuan islands, and in the west and north coast of New Guinea.
T. h. massena – found in eastern New Guinea, Karkar Island, the Bismarck Archipelago, the Solomon Islands and Vanuatu
T. h. nesophilus – found on Ninigo and Hermit Islands (Admiralty Islands)
T. h. flavicans – New Hanover and the Admiralty Islands
T. h. deplanchii, also known as Deplanche's lorikeet – is found on New Caledonia and the Loyalty Islands
T. h. nigrogularis – Kai and Aru Islands, and southern New Guinea. This includes the former subspecies caeruliceps and resembles the rainbow lorikeet (T. moluccanus). Molecular analysis using mitochondrial cytochrome b confirms this subspecies as more closely related to the latter taxon.

"Coconut lorikeet" has been designated as the official common name for the species by the International Ornithologists' Union (IOC).

Description 
The bill is orange-red, and the head dark blue fading to brown at the neck. It has a yellow collar and green upperparts. The breast is red with blue-black barring, and the belly is green with yellow barring. The tail is green above and barred in green and yellow below. The male's iris is bright red, while in the female it is orange-red.

Distribution and habitat
Trichoglossus haematodus is found in eastern Indonesia, on Buru, Seram, Misool, Waigeo, Numfoor, Yapen and the Aru Islands, in Indonesia and Papua New Guinea on New Guinea, in the Bismarck Archipelago, the Solomon Islands, Vanuatu and New Caledonia.

The species occupies a wide range of lowland and wooded hill habitats, including mangroves, rainforest, nypa forest, swamps, savanna and woodland. It also occupies human-modified areas including coconut plantations, gardens, agricultural land and disturbed forest.

Biology

These lorikeets have on the tip of their specialized tongue a small brush, which is actually the tongue's extended papillae. With the help of the tongue, they are able to feed on nectar and pollen from flowers. They mainly feed on nectar and pollen, but they also eat other parts of the flowers, as well as seeds, fruits, berries, insects, and larvae. They usually make a huge noise during flight, emitting screeching calls (e.g. “peaow-peaow-peaow”), at regular intervals.

Coconut lorikeets are monogamous birds, choosing only one partner for their whole life. They are diurnal birds living in very large bands. In the evening, they join their fellows in a dormitory tree. These birds may breed throughout most of year, depending on the region. Usually they breed in the spring, from July to December. They usually raise one brood a year, sometimes two.

Females lay two matte white, round eggs and incubate them for 23–25 days. Parents feed the chicks for 7–8 weeks, after which they leave the nest and after another 2–3 weeks they become completely independent.

Gallery

References 

coconut lorikeet
Birds of Melanesia
coconut lorikeet
coconut lorikeet
Articles containing video clips